The Age of Desire is a 1923 American silent drama film directed by Frank Borzage and starring Josef Swickard, William Collier Jr., and Mary Philbin. It was distributed through Associated First National Pictures.

Plot
As described in a film magazine review, Janet Loring deserts her young son Ranny when she marries the millionaire Malcolm Trask. Ranny becomes the tool of a criminal, but saves all of the money he gets so he can buy a home for the young woman that he loves. His mother misses him, and attempts to locate him by advertising for him. As a scheme, the crook sends Ranny in response to the advertisement, not knowing that he is really her son. Ranny takes money from his mother, but then becomes conscience stricken, and admits to her that he is an imposter. However, she convinces him that he belongs to her. Ranny promises to go straight, and Trask is happy to have a son. Ranny marries his sweetheart.

Cast

Preservation
With no prints of The Age of Desire located in any film archives, it is a lost film.

References

External links

Daybill long poster
lantern slide(archived)

1923 films
American silent feature films
Films directed by Frank Borzage
Lost American films
First National Pictures films
Silent American drama films
1923 drama films
1923 lost films
1920s American films